The Leonardo da Vinci International Award is an annual international prize named after Leonardo da Vinci, to award outstanding achievement by young people involved in the study of the sciences, technology, literature and the arts. Among the disciplines recognised and rewarded so far have been painting, sculpture, music, geology, architecture, medicine and nuclear physics. Its previous laureates include musicians Evelyn Glennie and Leonidas Kavakos.

History 
The Leonardo da Vinci International Award was founded in 1975 by the Rotary Club of Florence in collaboration with the Athens, Tours and Wien-Ring Rotary Clubs.

Since its foundation, seven more European Rotary clubs have joined the initiative:

 1981: Madrid
 1983: Brussels
 1984: London 
 1984: Würzburg 
 1989: Amsterdam 
 2006: Dublin
 2017: Copenhagen

As of July 2020, eleven Rotary Clubs in Europe participate in this award ceremony: Florence, Tours, Vienna, Athens, Madrid, Würzburg, Brussels, Amsterdam, London, Dublin and Copenhagen.

Ceremonies

References

Arts awards
Leonardo da Vinci